FC GAI Kiselyovsk was a Russian football team from Kiselyovsk. It played professionally from 1966 to 1970 and from 1993 to 1994. Their best result was 1st place in Zone 6 of the Soviet Second League in 1969.

Team name history
 1966–1991: FC Shakhtyor Kiselyovsk
 1992: FC Nika Kiselyovsk
 1993–1996: FC Shakhtyor Kiselyovsk
 1997: FC GAI Kiselyovsk

External links
  Team history at KLISF

Association football clubs established in 1966
Association football clubs disestablished in 1998
Defunct football clubs in Russia
Sport in Kemerovo Oblast
1966 establishments in Russia
1998 disestablishments in Russia